Kafiluddin is a Bangladesh Awami League politician and the former Member of Parliament of Chittagong-9.

Career
Kafiluddin was elected to parliament from Chittagong-9 as a Bangladesh Awami League candidate in 1973.

References

Awami League politicians
Living people
1st Jatiya Sangsad members
People from Chittagong District
Year of birth missing (living people)